Covington Residential Historic District is a national historic district located at Covington, Fountain County, Indiana. The district encompasses 109 contributing buildings in a predominantly residential section of Covington.  It developed between about 1830 and 1958, and includes notable examples of Gothic Revival, Federal, Greek Revival, Italianate, Queen Anne, and Colonial Revival style architecture.  Located in the district are the separately listed Carnegie Library of Covington, Fountain County Clerk's Building, and William C.B. Sewell House.  Other notable contributing buildings include the Senator Daniel W. Voorhees House (c. 1880), Ward House (c. 1890), Kid & Mary DeHaven House (1880), Bisland House (1910), Spinning House (c. 1898), Mayer House (1907), Johnson House (c. 1915), Ristine-Savage House (1852), J. D. Fine Boggs House (1923-1924, Livengood House (c. 1930), Enos H. Nebeker House (1894), Hamilton-Reed House (c. 1835, 1886), Covington Methodist Church (1889), Clark House (c. 1865), and Allen-Cates House (c. 1870).

It was listed on the National Register of Historic Places in 2015.

References

Historic districts on the National Register of Historic Places in Indiana
Federal architecture in Indiana
Gothic Revival architecture in Indiana
Greek Revival architecture in Indiana
Italianate architecture in Indiana
Queen Anne architecture in Indiana
Colonial Revival architecture in Indiana
Houses in Fountain County, Indiana
Historic districts in Fountain County, Indiana
National Register of Historic Places in Fountain County, Indiana